Horologica anisocorda is a species of sea snail, a gastropod in the family Cerithiopsidae. It was described by Jay and Drivas, in 2002.

Distribution
This marine species occurs off Papua New Guinea.

References

New species of Cerithiopsidae (Gastropoda: Triphoroidea) from Papua New Guinea (Pacific Ocean). Visaya Suppl. 11: 1-187

Cerithiopsidae
Gastropods described in 2002